Taniantaweng Shan is a mountain range in the Tibet Autonomous Region of China, near the border with Qinghai.

References

Mountain ranges of Tibet
Tibetan Plateau